Out of the Blue is the seventh studio album by the British rock group Electric Light Orchestra (ELO), released on October 28th, 1977. Written and produced by ELO frontman Jeff Lynne, the double album is among the most commercially successful records in the group's history, selling about 10 million copies worldwide by 2007.

Recording
Jeff Lynne wrote the entire album in three and a half weeks after a sudden burst of creativity while hidden away in his rented chalet in the Swiss Alps. It took a further two months to record in Munich.

Content

It was one of the first pop albums to have an extensive use of the vocoder, and helped to popularize it.

Side 1
The opening track, "Turn To Stone", was described by Donald A. Guarisco as "a good example of Electric Light Orchestra's skill for mixing string-laden pop hooks with driving rock and roll", praising the "array of swirling string lines that dart in and out of the mix and some dazzling falsetto harmonies that interact with Lynne's lead vocal in call and response style".

The following track is "It's Over", which takes on what Billboard Magazine described as a "classical feel". Cash Box said that it begins "with simple chording which opens to a strumming beat" and that the "strings add panorama" and that "the vocals are characteristically crystalline and soaring."

"Sweet Talkin' Woman" serves as the band's "first real step into the disco sound [...] a string-laden pop tune whose dance-friendly edge helped it become a disco-era hit". AllMusic's Donald A. Guarisco attributed its disco sound to "Bev Bevan's steady drum work" and "pounding piano lines, delirous bursts of swirling strings, and endlessly overdubbed backing vocals [that] mesh seamlessly to form an ornate but driving funhouse of pop hooks". Billboard described the song as a "catchy rocker characterized by semi-classical elements."

Side 2
The "tender ballad" "Steppin' Out" closes Side 2.

Side 3: Concerto for a Rainy Day 

Side three of the release is subtitled Concerto for a Rainy Day, a four-track musical suite based on the weather and how it affects mood change, ending with the eventual sunshine and happiness of "Mr. Blue Sky". This was inspired by Lynne's experience while trying to write songs for the album against a torrential downpour of rain outside his Swiss Chalet. "Standin' in the Rain" opens the suite with a haunting keyboard over a recording of real rain, recorded by Lynne just outside his rented studio during a very rainy summer in Munich. Also heard at the 0:33 mark of the song, which marks the beginning of The Concerto, is thunder crackling in an unusual manner voicing the words "Concerto for a Rainy Day" by the band's keyboardist, Richard Tandy.

"Big Wheels" forms the second part of the suite and continues with the theme of the weather and reflection. Apart from its inclusion on the Out of the Blue album, the song has never appeared on any of the band's compilations or as a B-side until 2000, when Lynne included it on the group's retrospective Flashback album. "Summer and Lightning" is the third song in the suite. The raining weather theme is continued throughout the track, though the mood and lyrics are more optimistic. "Mr. Blue Sky", an uplifting, lively song celebrating sunshine, is the finale of "Concerto for a Rainy Day" suite. Again, the Vocoder is used at the end of the track where, at the 4:54 mark, one can hear "Please turn me over" as it fades out. It is the only piece from the Concerto to be excerpted as a single.

Side 4
Mark Beaumont said that the first track on Side 4, "Sweet Is The Night", "[sweeps] from an elegant glam-funk strut to a chorus that [is] essentially All The Young Dudes base-jumping."

The album closer is "Wild West Hero", which was released as the third single from the album. It reached a peak position of number 6.

Cover art
The large spaceship on the album's cover (by now symbolic of the group) was designed by Kosh with art by Shusei Nagaoka. It was based on the logo Kosh designed for ELO's previous album, A New World Record, and looks like the space station with a docking shuttle from 2001: A Space Odyssey (1968). The number JTLA 823 L2 which is featured on the shuttle arriving at the space station is the original catalogue number for the album. The album also included an insert of a cardboard cutout of the space station as well as a fold-out poster of the band members. The space theme was carried onto the live stage in the form of a huge glowing flying saucer stage set, inside which the band performed.

Release
The album had 4 million pre-ordered copies and quickly went multi-Platinum upon release. Out of the Blue spawned five hit singles in different countries, and was ELO's most commercially successful studio album. It was also the first double album in the history of the UK music charts to generate four top twenty hit singles. Lynne considers A New World Record and Out of the Blue to be the group's crowning achievements, and both sold extremely well, reaching multi-platinum according to RIAA Certification. Capital Radio and The Daily Mirror Rock and Pop Awards (forerunner to The Brit Awards) named it "Album of the Year" in 1978. Lynne received his first Ivor Novello award for Outstanding Contributions to British Music the same year.

The US release of Out of the Blue was originally distributed by United Artists. This changed after United Artists Records was sold by Transamerica Corporation to an EMI Records-backed partnership, which triggered Jet Records' change of control clause in its distribution contract, and Jet shifted to CBS Records as its new distributor.  American cut-out copies of Out of the Blue soon became widely available at discounted prices in record shops in the US and Canada shortly after the album's release, affecting the album's sales and triggering lawsuits by CBS and Jet. The suits were ultimately unsuccessful in stopping the discounted sales.

Reissues
The 30th Anniversary Edition was released in February 2007 with three bonus tracks, as part of the Sony/BMG Music Epic/Legacy series. The 30th anniversary issue was a limited pressing in hardback book with expanded 24-page full colour booklet. It includes full-length sleeve notes by Lynne and ELO archivist Rob Caiger, as well as rare photos and memorabilia. A push-out replica ELO Space Station is included as well as the standard jewel case edition with a full colour 12-page edited booklet. The album once again reached the top twenty album charts in the UK peaking at number 18. A sixth single "Latitude 88 North" was released as digital download single and as a promo 7" single.

In 2012, Music on Vinyl re-released Out of the Blue on vinyl on Epic; the first 1,000 copies were made on transparent blue vinyl and the rest were released in the standard black vinyl.

In 2017, to celebrate the 40th anniversary of the album, a double picture vinyl disc was released by Sony Music and Epic Records.

Reception and legacy

In a contemporary review for Rolling Stone, Billy Altman said that the album was "meticulously produced and performed" and showed the influence of the Beatles, the Beach Boys and the Bee Gees. However, he detected a lack of passion in the work, which he dismissed as a "totally uninteresting and horrifyingly sterile package" and "All method and no madness: perfectly hollow and bland rock Muzak."

Over the years a more favourable view has developed. Rob Mitchum of Pitchfork wrote in 2007: "Calling in the string section and commissioning the spaceship cover-art may be a big gamble, but Out of the Blue is proof of how good it can sound when the grand approach works."

In 2000 it was voted number 346 in Colin Larkin's All Time Top 1000 Albums. The album was also included in the book 1001 Albums You Must Hear Before You Die.

Axl Rose – by his own admission "an old ELO fanatic" – said: "Out of the Blue is an awesome record."

In October 2013, the album was ranked 23rd on VH1's list "Double Trouble: The 35 Best-Selling Double Albums of All Time".

Track listing
All songs written by Jeff Lynne.

Personnel
Credits according to the record liner notes, unless noted.
ELO
Jeff Lynne – lead and backing vocals, lead, rhythm and slide guitars (Gibson EDS-1275, Gibson Les Paul Custom, Gibson Marauder, Ovation 1615/4, Ovation 1619/4), Wurlitzer electric piano, Minimoog
Bev Bevan – Slingerland drums, Remo Rototoms, Avedis Zildjian cymbals, Slingerland Bev Bevan drumsticks, Remo drumheads, gong, various percussion instruments, backing vocals, fire extinguisher on "Mr. Blue Sky"
Richard Tandy – Yamaha C7B piano, Yamaha CS-80, Wurlitzer electric piano, ARP 2600, Minimoog, Polymoog, ARP Omni, ARP Odyssey, Hohner clavinet, SLM Concert Spectrum, Mellotron M400, sequencers, Gibson SG Custom electric guitar
Kelly Groucutt – co-lead vocals on "Sweet Is the Night", harmony and backing vocals, Gibson G3 bass guitar, percussion
Mik Kaminski – violin
Hugh McDowell – cello
Melvyn Gale – cello, jangle piano on "Wild West Hero" (uncredited)

Production
Jeff Lynne – Producer
Mack – Engineer
Jeff Lynne, Richard Tandy and Louis Clark – Orchestral and choral arrangements
Orchestra conducted by Louis Clark
Original LP Mastering – Stan Ricker (USA) and Kevin Metcalfe (UK)

Charts

Weekly charts
Original release

Reissue

Year-end charts

Certifications

References

External links
Discography at Discogs.com

1977 albums
Albums produced by Jeff Lynne
CBS Records albums
Columbia Records albums
Electric Light Orchestra albums
Epic Records albums
United Artists Records albums
Jet Records albums
Albums with cover art by Shusei Nagaoka